"Montego Bay" is a song co-written and performed by Bobby Bloom about the city in Jamaica of the same name. The song was a top 10 hit for Bloom in the Fall of 1970 on both sides of the Atlantic. It reached No. 3 on the UK Singles Chart, No. 5 on the Canadian RPM 100 Singles Chart, No. 7 on the Australian Go-Set Singles Chart and No. 8 on the US Billboard Hot 100. The song was co-written and produced by Jeff Barry. In the master tape of the song, Bloom breaks into a chorus of "Oh, What a Beautiful Mornin'" at the end of the recording. The song features a whistler, as well as Jamaican instruments in a calypso style.

Bloom's recording of the song appeared in the 1997 film The Ice Storm.

Chart history

Weekly charts

Freddie Notes & the Rudies cover

Sugar Cane cover

Jon Stevens cover

Quarrington/Worthy cover

Allniters cover

Amazulu cover

Year-end charts

Jon Stevens version

In January 1980, New Zealand recording artist Jon Stevens released a version as a single. It peaked at No.1 in New Zealand, allowing Stevens to replace himself at No.1, and stayed there for two weeks.

Track listing
Vinyl, 7-inch, 45 RPM
 "Montego Bay"	2:50
 "Sha La La" 4:25

Charts

Year-end charts

Other recordings
 (1970) Freddie Notes & The Rudies - (Trojan Records)
 (1971) The Bar-Kays on their album Black Rock
 (1971) James Last on his album Happyning
 (1974) Foster, Pat, & Angie Sylvers on their album Foster Sylvers Featuring Pat & Angie Sylvers
 (1978) Sugar Cane - a minor UK disco hit for the U.S. male/female vocal group. Highest position in UK Singles Chart - No. 54
 (1983) Allniters - a Top 20 hit for an Australian ska band. 
 (1986) Amazulu - reached No. 16 in the UK and No. 6 in Canada and was a minor hit in the U.S. in September 1986
 (2005) Les Fradkin - on his CD Under The Covers

See also
 List of number-one singles from the 1980s (New Zealand)
 List of 1970s one-hit wonders in the United States

References

External links
NZ On Screen - Montego Bay music video

1970 singles
1978 singles
1980 singles
1983 singles
1986 singles
Calypso songs
CBS Records singles
Jon Stevens songs
Montego Bay
Number-one singles in New Zealand
Songs about Jamaica
Songs written by Bobby Bloom
Songs written by Jeff Barry